Suet is the raw, hard fat of beef, lamb or mutton found around the loins and kidneys.

Suet has a melting point of between 45 °C and 50 °C (113 °F and 122 °F) and congelation between 37 °C and 40 °C (98.6 °F and 104 °F). Its high smoke point makes it ideal for deep frying and pastry production.

The primary use of suet is to make tallow, although it is also used as an ingredient in cooking, especially in traditional baked puddings, such as British Christmas pudding. Suet is made into tallow in a process called rendering, which involves melting fats and extended simmering, followed by straining, then cooling. The entire process is then usually repeated to refine the product.

Etymology
The word suet  is derived from Anglo-Norman , from Old French , from Latin  ('tallow', 'grease', 'hard animal fat'). Sebum is from the Proto-Indo-European root  ('pour out, trickle'), so it shares a root with sap and soap.

Trade 

In the 17th century economy of the Viceroyalty of Peru, Chile's husbandry and agriculture based economy had a peripheral role exporting mainly suet, jerky and leather to the other provinces of the viceroyalty. The importance of this trade led Chilean historian Benjamín Vicuña Mackenna to label the 17th century the century of suet.

Cuisine 

Suet is found in several traditional British dishes. Suet pastry is soft in contrast to the crispness of shortcrust pastry, which makes it ideal for certain sweet and savoury dishes. Suet is most widely used in sweet British baked puddings, such as jam roly-poly and spotted dick. Savoury dishes include dumplings, which are made using a mixture of suet, flour and water rolled into balls that are added to stews during the final twenty minutes or so of cooking. In the savoury dish steak and kidney pie or steak and kidney pudding, a bowl is lined with a suet pastry, the meat is placed inside and a lid of suet pastry tightly seals the meat. The pudding is then steamed for approximately four hours before serving. Suet is also an ingredient of traditional mincemeat, which is also referred to as 'fruit mince'.

As it is the fat from around the kidneys, the connective tissue, blood and other non-fat content  must be removed. It then must be coarsely grated. It must be  refrigerated prior to use and used within a few days of purchase, similar to raw meat.

Due to its high energy content, cold weather explorers use suet to supplement the high daily energy requirement needed to travel in such climates. Typically the energy requirement is around 5,000–6,000 Cal per day for sledge hauling or dog-sled travelling. Suet is added to food rations to increase the fat content and help meet this high energy requirement.

Availability

Pre-packaged suet sold in supermarkets is dehydrated suet. It is mixed with flour to make it stable at room temperature, requiring some care when using it for recipes calling for fresh suet, as the proportions of flour to fat can change. Most modern processed recipes stipulate packaged suet.

Also available is vegetable suet, which is made from refined vegetable oil.

Cultural and religious restrictions

Consumption of suet is forbidden according to the Jewish religion and it was reserved for ritual altar sacrifices. This restriction only applies to those animals which were used for sacrifices, and thus does not include wild animals such as deer. Maimonides in his book Guide To The Perplexed, writes that one of the ideas behind this commandment is that the Torah wants to teach people to develop the discipline to avoid very tasty foods that are unhealthy.

Bird feed

Woodpeckers, goldfinches, juncos, cardinals, thrushes, jays, kinglets, bluebirds, chickadees, nuthatches, wrens, and starlings prefer suet-based bird feeders.

Bird feed is commonly used in the form of cakes of suet, which can be made with other solid fats, such as lard. Rolled oats, bird seed, cornmeal, raisins, and unsalted nuts are often incorporated into the suet cakes.

Suet-based recipes

 Christmas pudding
 Clangers
 Clootie dumplings
 Dumplings
 Haggis
 Jamaican patty
 Kishka/Kishke
 Mincemeat
 Pemmican
 Rag pudding
 Spotted dick
 Steak and kidney pudding
 Suet pudding
 Sussex pond pudding
 Suet-crust pastry
 Windsor pudding

See also

 Dripping
 Leaf lard
 Schmaltz

References

Animal fat products
Cooking fats
Bird feeding